Hüsrev Gerede (1884 in Adrianople, Adrianople Vilayet – March 30, 1962 in Istanbul) was a Turkish diplomat and career officer, who served in the Ottoman Army and the Turkish Army.

Biography 

His ancestors came from Bosnia-Herzegovina: his grandfather was Ali Pasha Rizvanbegović. He received his military education attending the Ottoman Military College and the Military Academy. After his graduation, he  entered the Ottoman army and was deployed to the eastern provinces during the World War I. He was one of the early supporters of Mustafa Kemal (Atatürk) during the Turkish War of Independence and was a participant of both the Sivas and the Erzurum congress. He became a deputy of the Ottoman Parliament and after its dissolution as well of the Turkish Grand National Assembly. As in 1934 the surname law obliged all Turkish citizens to bear a surname, he chose Gerede. He was also a seasoned diplomat and was the Turkish ambassador to Romania from 1924 to 1926 and Nazi Germany from 1939 to 1942.

Works
Türk - Nippon Dostluğunun Sonsuz Hatıraları, Ertuğrul, 1937.
Siyasî Hatıralarım, I inci İran, 1952.
Mübarek Ertuğrul Şehitlerimiz ve Muhteşem Anıları, 1956.
Harb İçinde Almanya, 1939-1942, İstanbul, 1994.

Medals and decorations
Medal of Independence with Red-Green Ribbon

See also
List of recipients of the Medal of Independence with Red-Green Ribbon (Turkey)

Sources

External links
Hüsrev Gerede’nin Atatürk anıları, MTVMSNBC 

1884 births
1962 deaths
People from Edirne
People from Adrianople vilayet
Republican People's Party (Turkey) politicians
Deputies of Trabzon
Deputies of Şanlıurfa
Deputies of Sivas
Ottoman Army officers
Turkish colonels
Ottoman military personnel of the Balkan Wars
Ottoman military personnel of World War I
Members of Kuva-yi Milliye
Turkish military personnel of the Turkish War of Independence
20th-century Turkish diplomats
Ambassadors of Turkey to Iran
Ambassadors of Turkey to Japan
Ambassadors of Turkey to Germany
Ambassadors of Turkey to Brazil
Monastir Military High School alumni
Ottoman Military Academy alumni
Ottoman Military College alumni
Recipients of the Liakat Medal
Recipients of the Imtiyaz Medal
Recipients of the Medal of Independence with Red-Green Ribbon (Turkey)
Ambassadors of Turkey to Hungary